Whispering Sage is a 1927 American silent Western film directed by Scott R. Dunlap and written by Harold Shumate. It is based on the 1922 novel Whispering Sage by Harry Sinclair Drago and Joseph Noel. The film stars Buck Jones, Natalie Joyce, Émile Chautard, Carl Miller, Albert J. Smith and Joseph W. Girard. The film was released on March 20, 1927, by Fox Film Corporation.

Cast 
 Buck Jones as Buck Kildare
 Natalie Joyce as Mercedes
 Émile Chautard as José Arastrade
 Carl Miller as Esteban Bengoa
 Albert J. Smith as Ed Fallows
 Joseph W. Girard as Hugh Acklin 
 William Steele as Tom Kildare 
 Ellen Winston as Mrs. Kildare
 Hazel Keener as Mercedes' Friend
 Enrique Acosta as Old Pedro

References

External links
 

1927 films
1927 Western (genre) films
Fox Film films
Films directed by Scott R. Dunlap
American black-and-white films
Silent American Western (genre) films
1920s English-language films
1920s American films